Jon Eric Rosenthal (born August 17, 1963) is an American engineer and politician. He is a Democrat member of the Texas House of Representatives, representing the 135th District including Northwest Houston, Cypress, and Jersey Village.

Rosenthal was sworn into the Texas House on January 8, 2019, after winning the November 2018 general election. He defeated 12-term incumbent Republican Gary Elkins.

As a freshman member of the 86th Legislative Session, Rosenthal was appointed to the House Committee on County Affairs and the House Committee on Energy Resources. Rosenthal was honored as the Freshman of the Year by the Texas Legislative Study Group.

Prior to his election to the House of Representatives, Rosenthal founded an Indivisible movement group in Texas Congressional District 7. He has worked for over 25 years as a Project Manager, Engineering Manager, and Subsea Systems Engineer in and around the oil and gas industry.

References

External links 

 State legislative page 
 Texas Tribune page

Democratic Party members of the Texas House of Representatives
21st-century American politicians
Living people
Politicians from Houston
Engineers from Texas
Cockrell School of Engineering alumni
1963 births